Gaye holud ( lit: "yellow/turmeric on the body") or gatro horidra (গাত্র-হরিদ্রা) is a ceremony observed mostly in Bangladesh and in the Indian state of West Bengal, Tripura and Assam by all Bengalis regardless of their religion.

It is part of an elaborate series of celebrations constituting the Bengali wedding. The gaye holud takes place prior to the religious and legal Bengali wedding ceremonies. The gaye holud may be a joint event for the bride and groom's families, or it may consist of separate events for the bride's family and the groom's family.

Ceremonial process 

The bride is seated on a dais and the turmeric paste is applied by the guests to her face and body. Turmeric is known to cleanse, soften and brighten the skin, giving the bride's skin the distinctive yellow hue that gives its name to this ceremony. The sweets are then fed to the bride by all the guests and attendants, piece by piece. In Muslim Bengali families the henna is used to decorate her hands and feet with elaborate abstract designs.

Popularity of the custom 
Although similar ceremonies exist in other parts of the Indian subcontinent, the gaye holud is a custom particular to the Bengali people. It is not considered a religious function, as it is celebrated by Muslims, Hindus, and Christians in both Bangladesh, the Indian state of West Bengal and wherever Bengalis live irrespective of religion. Although it is considered a part of the Bengali wedding tradition, the couple is not considered married at the end of the gaye holud. There is no legal marriage performed during this ceremony. Unlike the wedding ceremonies, the gaye holud is not a formal or extravagant event; both guests and bridal party members dress more simply and decorate the venue less intricately than at the wedding ceremonies.

See also
 Wedding in Bangladesh
 Culture of Bangladesh
 Culture of West Bengal

References

External links

Bengali culture
Indian wedding traditions
Bangladeshi wedding traditions